Mayor Otaño or Mayor Julio D. Otaño is a town and district in the Itapúa Department of Paraguay.

Sources 
World Gazeteer: Paraguay – World-Gazetteer.com

Districts of Itapúa Department